Jean Garby (21 June 1896 – 14 May 1964) was a French racing cyclist. He rode in the 1924 Tour de France.

References

1896 births
1964 deaths
French male cyclists
Place of birth missing